Flight 375 may refer to:

Eastern Air Lines Flight 375, crashed on 4 October 1960
VASP Flight 375, hijacked on 29 September 1988

0375